Poliačik, female Poliačiková, is a Slovak surname. Notable people with the surname include:

Dušan Poliačik (born 1955), Slovak weightlifter
Martin Poliačik (born 1980), Slovak politician

Slovak-language surnames